Karen Marie Connelly (born 12 March 1969) is a Canadian travel writer, novelist and poet who has written extensively about her experiences living in Greece, Thailand and Canada.

Life and work
Connelly was born in Calgary, Alberta. At seventeen, she lived in a Thai village thanks to a Rotary exchange scholarship. She returned to Canada a year later. At nineteen, she left for Spain, where she lived almost two years. Having no work visa, she supported herself by, among other things, teaching English as a second language. In her spare time, she wrote about her experiences and took photographs with which to illustrate her writing. She also reworked the letters and journals, which she had written in Thailand, into a manuscript that was to become Touch the Dragon by Karen Connelly.

In 1991, she moved to France and settled in Montclar, Avignon, where she studied French and Spanish. Soon after, she travelled to Greece, spending most of her time on the island of Lesbos, to which she has occasionally returned. She then moved back to Canada for an extended period, writing and promoting her work.

Her first book, a poetry collection entitled The Small Words in My Body (1990), won the Pat Lowther Award for poetry in 1991. Her second book, Touch the Dragon: A Thai Journal (1992), won the Governor General's Award for non-fiction.

Three poetry collections followed, This Brighter Prison (1993) The Disorder of Love (1997) and The Border Surrounds Us (2000). She also compiled a book of letters, One Room in a Castle, detailing her experiences in Europe.

In 1996, she returned to Thailand and also visited Myanmar (she prefers the older name, Burma). Her experiences there served as the basis for her novel about a political prisoner, The Lizard Cage, which won the Orange Broadband Prize for New Writers and was longlisted for the 2007 International Dublin Literary Award.

Connelly remained in Thailand for two years before returning to Canada, where she married. She lives in Toronto.

Bibliography

The Small Words in My Body – 1990
Touch the Dragon: A Thai Journal — 1992
This Brighter Prison: A Book of Journeys — 1993
One Room in a Castle — 1995
The Disorder of Love — 1997
The Border Surrounds Us — 2000
Grace and Poison [reprints The Small Words in My Body and The Disorder of Love with a new preface] – 2001
The Lizard Cage – 2005
Burmese Lessons – 2010
Come Cold River – 2013
The Change Room – 2017

See also

List of Canadian poets

References

External links
 Official Website
Karen Connelly's entry in The Canadian Encyclopedia
 1993 Interview Transcript
 2007 online interview from CBC Words at Large
 Audio interview about Burmese Lessons (2009)

1969 births
Living people
20th-century Canadian poets
20th-century Canadian women writers
21st-century Canadian novelists
21st-century Canadian poets
21st-century Canadian women writers
Canadian people of Irish descent
Canadian women poets
Canadian women novelists
Governor General's Award-winning non-fiction writers
Writers from Calgary
Canadian women non-fiction writers